Wolfgang Amadeus Mozart's Violin Concerto No. 1 in B major, K. 207, once was supposed to have been composed in 1775 (when Mozart was 19), along with the other four wholly authentic violin concertos. However, analysis of handwriting and the manuscript paper on which the concerto was written suggest that the date of composition might have been 1773. It has the usual fast–slow–fast structure.

Movements are:

The concerto is full of brilliant passage work with running sixteenth notes. It is characterized generally by high spirits.

The Rondo in B, K. 269, for violin and orchestra, also is connected to this concerto. It was intended to replace the finale movement, and was composed to fulfil the recommendation of Antonio Brunetti, a violinist in Salzburg at the time.

Nonetheless, typically the concerto is performed with the original finale and the K. 269 Rondo remains a separate concert-piece.

External links 

, Natalia Todorova, Academic State Orchestra, Milen Apostolov conducting

1
1775 compositions
Compositions in B-flat major